Westlake Square is a  park in Seattle, Washington, adjacent to Westin Seattle. It was formerly a combination streetcar stop and underground comfort station. The former comfort station was demolished and filled in 1964.

In 2010, Seattle Department of Transportation redeveloped Westlake Square and adjacent McGraw Square into a new plaza for the South Lake Union Streetcar.

See also
Westlake Park, a larger park nearby
Westlake Station, in the nearby underground transit tunnel
McGraw Square, a plaza located one block south on Westlake Avenue

References

External links

Westlake Square at Seattle Parks and Recreation

Parks in Seattle
Squares in Seattle
Denny Triangle, Seattle